U67, U-67 or U 67 may refer to:

 German submarine U-67, several German submarines
 The current or one of three previous state highways numbered 67 in Utah, United States 
 Legacy Parkway, a current route internally designated as Utah State Route 67, located in notherwestern Salt County and western Davis County
Utah State Route 67 (1975-1991), a former state highway in northeastern Tooele County
Utah State Route 67 (1962-1969), a former state highway in St. George in Washington County
Utah State Route 67 (1931-1962), a former state highway in northeastern Tooele County and northwestern Salt Lake County
U 67, an alternative title for The Sea Ghost, a 1931 American film directed by William Nigh